Pan Chung-wei (born August 10, 1976) is a former Taiwanese baseball player for had played for the La New Bears.

References

1976 births
Living people
Asian Games bronze medalists for Chinese Taipei
Asian Games medalists in baseball
Baseball first basemen
Baseball players at the 1998 Asian Games
La New Bears players
Medalists at the 1998 Asian Games
People from Pingtung County
Taiwanese baseball players